Li Keqiang (born 1 July 1955) is a Chinese economist and politician who served as the premier of the People's Republic of China from 2013 to 2023. He was also the second-ranked member of the Politburo Standing Committee of the Chinese Communist Party (CCP) from 2012 to 2022. Li was a major part of the "fifth generation of Chinese leadership" along with Xi Jinping, the CCP general secretary.

Born in Hefei, Anhui province in 1955, Li initially rose through the ranks of Chinese politics through his involvement in the Communist Youth League of China (CYLC), serving as its first secretary from 1993 to 1998. From 1998 to 2004, Li served as the governor of Henan and the province's party secretary. From 2004 to 2007 he served as the Party Secretary of Liaoning, the top political office in the province. From 2008 to 2013, Li served as the first-ranked vice premier under then-premier Wen Jiabao, overseeing a broad portfolio which included economic development, price controls, finance, climate change, and macroeconomic management.

Initially seen as a candidate for becoming the paramount leader, Li instead assumed the post of premier in 2013, and has facilitated the Chinese government's shifting of priorities from export-led growth to a greater focus on internal consumption. During his term Li headed the State Council and was one of the leading figures behind China's Financial and Economic Affairs, Foreign Affairs, National Security and Deepening Reforms. Additionally, Li and his cabinet initiated the Made in China 2025 strategic plan in May 2015. He was succeeded as premier by Li Qiang in March 2023. 

Given his Youth League experience, Li has generally been considered a political ally of former leader Hu Jintao and a member of the Tuanpai faction. Economically seen as advocating reform and liberalization, Li has been described as representing the more pragmatic and technocratic side of China's leadership. Some believe that Li has been sidelined by Xi Jinping's consolidation of power.

Early life and education 
Li Keqiang was born on 1 July 1955 in Hefei, Anhui province. His father was a local official in Anhui. Li graduated from Hefei No.8 Senior High School in 1974, during the Cultural Revolution, and was sent for rural labour in Fengyang County, Anhui, where he eventually joined the Chinese Communist Party and made his way in becoming the party head of the local production team. He was awarded the honor of Outstanding Individual in the Study of Mao Zedong Thought during this time.

Li refused his father's offer of grooming him for the local county's party leadership and entered Peking University Law School, where he became the president of the university's student council and later received a Bachelor of Laws in 1982. After working for about six years, he returned to Peking University for graduate studies in 1988. He received a Master of Economics and a Doctor of Philosophy in Economics from Peking University in 1995. His doctoral advisor was the prominent economist Li Yining (no relation). At the invitation of Li Yining, Li Keqiang's doctoral dissertation review committee was composed of well-known Chinese economists and researchers. Because of the high academic rigor of the committee, Li Keqiang postponed the defense of his dissertation by half a year. Commented as being able to "withstand any kind of inspection" by his doctoral advisor, Li Keqiang's doctoral dissertation, "On the ternary structure of Chinese economy," published in 1991, was awarded the Sun Yefang Prize, China's highest prize in economics, in 1996.

In 1982, Li became the Communist Youth League secretary at Peking University. He entered the top leadership of the national organization of the Communist Youth League of China (CYLC) in 1983 as a member of its secretariat, and has worked closely with former Party general secretary Hu Jintao, who also rose through the ranks of the CYLC, ever since. Li became the organization's first secretary in 1993 and served until 1998. He is a representative member of the first generation to have risen from the CYLC leadership.

Rising through the ranks (1998–2012)

Provincial tenures 
Li became the youngest Chinese provincial governor in June 1998 when he was appointed governor of Henan at the age of 43. According to provincial officials working with him at the time, Li refused to participate in any banquets or large fancy events not related to government activities. During his time as governor, a public sense of his "bad luck" grew due to the occurrence of three major fires in the province.

Li is known to be outspoken and led economic development in Henan, transforming the poor inland region into an attractive area for investment. Li did not spend time pursuing superficial projects. He trekked through all regions of the province trying to search for a comprehensive solution to its growing problems. Henan jumped in national GDP rankings from 28th in the early 1990s to 18th in 2004, when Li left Henan. However, his government was relatively ineffective at curbing the HIV/AIDS epidemic that was affecting the rural areas of the province.

Li was transferred to work as the Party secretary in Liaoning in December 2004, taking on the top political office of the province. There he is known for the "Five-points to one Line" project, where he linked up Dalian and Dandong, as well as a series of other ports into a comprehensive network to improve trade flow. During his leadership in Liaoning, Li was revealed to have designed the "Keqiang index", an unconventional economic measurement indicator he devised that was said to bypass the often unreliable official GDP numbers and thus serves as a better indicator of economic health. Instead of gathering data on total economic output alone, Li used three other indicators to keep tabs on the economy while working in Liaoning province. These were, the railway cargo volume, electricity consumption and total loans disbursed by banks.

Given his Youth League experience and his association with then paramount leader Hu Jintao, Li was viewed from early on in Hu's term as a contender to succeed Hu when his term as party leader ended in 2012. Li joined the Politburo Standing Committee at the 17th Party Congress held in October 2007. He was succeeded in his provincial party secretary post by governor Zhang Wenyue. While Li's political future seemed promising, he was outranked on the Standing Committee by Xi Jinping, who had just left his role as party secretary of Shanghai to join the central leadership ranks in Beijing. This rank order ostensibly signaled that it would be Xi, not Li, who would eventually succeed Hu as party general secretary and president. At the 2008 National People's Congress, Li was elected vice premier, first in rank, reinforcing the speculation that Li would become premier and was being groomed to succeed then-premier Wen Jiabao.

Vice Premiership (2008–2013) 

During his first term in the PSC between 2007 and 2012, Li took on the most important portfolios in the Chinese government, including economic development, government budgets, land and resources, the environment, and health, ostensibly to prepare him for his upcoming premiership. He also became the head of central commissions overseeing the Three Gorges Dam and the South-North Water Transfer Project, as well as the leader of steering committees in charge of health care reform, food safety, and AIDS-related work. In addition, Li was the principal lieutenant to premier Wen Jiabao in the broad portfolios of climate change, energy, information technology, northeastern China revitalization, and developing the Chinese far west.

Li's first major appearance internationally was at the 2010 World Economic Forum in Davos, Switzerland. The event was seen as a litmus test for Li. At the forum, Li succinctly presented China's long-term vision for development in front of world business and political leaders. In particular, Li briefed the WEF on China's commitment to sustainable development, green energy, decreasing the income gap and modernizing key strategic industries. While reiterating Beijing's commitment to peaceful development and its focus in increasing domestic demand in the face of external pressures during the global financial crisis, Li also warned against protectionism, saying "opening up can be both bilateral and multilateral... in this sense, one plus one is more often than not bigger than two." He also touched upon the importance of international development, and international financial reform. He called for a global governance structure that was "more reflective of the changes in the global political and economic landscape."

In February 2010, Li gave a speech to ministerial and provincial-level leaders about the importance of changing the economic structure of the country in order to be better poised for future growth. The speech was published with minor omissions in the 1 June issue of Qiushi, the Communist Party's political theory publication. Li said that China had come to a critical historical inflection point where a fundamental shift in the structure of the economy must take place in order for the country to continue its path of growth. Li particularly emphasized the need to boost domestic consumption, and emphasized the importance of continued urbanization. Li also emphasized that China should be moving towards a more middle class-oriented society with an "olive"-shaped wealth distribution, with the majority of the country's population and wealth belonging to the middle class.

He has also reiterated the importance of industrialization, urbanization and agricultural modernization in China in order to improve its competitiveness, food security, energy security, affordable housing, and healthcare.

In August 2011, Li went on an official visit to Hong Kong, including a trip to the University of Hong Kong.  The political sensitivities and heightened security surrounding the event resulted in the Hong Kong 818 incident, an event that caused controversy in the territory.

Initially seen as a candidate for becoming the paramount leader, Li was instead elevated to the number two spot on the Politburo Standing Committee (PSC) at the 18th CCP National Congress held in the fall of 2012. As he was expected to become premier, this was a shift from previous convention on the PSC set in 1997 whereby the premier ranked third, after the Chairman of the Standing Committee of the National People's Congress, who ranked second. This change showed that the party intended to project Li as the number two figure in the Chinese political hierarchy, behind only party general secretary Xi Jinping. Also in that same year, he had personally met with the openly gay Ma Baoli (a policeman turned businessman) to discuss the threat posed by HIV. In the same conversation, they discussed LGBT issues on preventing discrimination which has been interpreted as a sign that the People's Republic is slowly coming around to the idea as major Chinese businesses have already begun tapping into the purchasing power of the LGBT community.

Premiership (2013–2023) 

On 15 March 2013, Li Keqiang was elected by the 12th National People's Congress (NPC) as premier, succeeding Wen Jiabao. Of the nearly 3,000 legislators assembled at the Congress, 2,940 voted for him, three against, and six abstained. At the same Congress, Party general secretary Xi Jinping was elected President.

On 16 March, the Congress selected Zhang Gaoli, Liu Yandong, Wang Yang, and Ma Kai as vice premiers following their respective nominations from Li Keqiang. He gave his first major speech 17 March at the conclusion of the NPC, calling for frugality in government, a fairer distribution of income and continued economic reform. Li has focused his attention on China to move towards a consumption based economy instead of relying on export led growth. Li was ranked 14th of the 2013 Forbes Magazine's List of The World's Most Powerful People, after taking the office of Chinese premier. On 18 March 2018, Li was reappointed premier of China after receiving 2,964 votes in favour and just two against by the National People's Congress.

On 11 March 2022, Li confirmed that he would be stepping down as premier of China upon the expiration of his second term in March 2023. However, there were speculations that he may continue serving as CCP Politburo Standing Committee member and chairman of the National People's Congress Standing Committee, which were ultimately proven false. During the 20th National Congress of the Chinese Communist Party in October 2022, Li was not included on the 20th Central Committee of the Chinese Communist Party which indicates his political retirement. Li's term officially ended on 11 March 2023, and he was replaced by Li Qiang, a close ally of Xi.

Domestic policy 

Li has an academic background in economics and is therefore a firm believer in the use of robust economic data to aid in government decision making. When Li initially entered office, China was facing numerous structural problems inherited from the previous administration. Namely, the large abundance of non-performing loans, that many of the giant infrastructure projects the country embarked on since the global financial crisis was overloaded with crushing debt and lower than expected revenues, and the increasingly large wealth gap. Under these circumstances, Li was said to have responded with what became known as "Likonomics", a term coined by economists at the investment bank Barclays Capital. Likonomics consisted of a three-prong approach that included the across-the-board reduction of debt, an end to massive stimulus practices of the Wen Jiabao government, and structural reforms. However, by 2014, global economic pressures and a decrease in demand of Chinese exports led to lower than expected economic growth rates. Year-on-year GDP growth amounted to less than 7.5% for the first time since 1989. Li's government then responded with tax cuts for small businesses, renovation projects of poor urban areas, and another round of rail construction, particularly focused on the country's interior.

After the announcement of comprehensive reforms at the Third Plenum in 2013, Li became a leading figure of the government's reform implementation efforts. The Third Plenum called for market forces to play a "decisive" role in the allocation of resources, ostensibly looking to decrease government regulation on the free market. In early 2014, Li said that local governments were still ineffective at following the central government's reform directives, and that some governments meddle in affairs they shouldn't be involved in, and some don't pay attention to things they should be doing. Li emphasized that the success of reforms came down to "execution and implementation", and criticized local governments for failing to act in support of reforms.

Since January 2020, Li has been in charge of the Chinese government's response to the COVID-19 pandemic. On 27 January, Li visited Wuhan, the original epicenter of the pandemic, to direct outbreak prevention work.

Reduction of bureaucracy 
Li is especially critical of unnecessary government bureaucracy, particularly at the grassroots level. He believes that many lower-level officials fail to provide services to the public in an effective manner. Regarding his disdain for the matter, Li's many quotable anecdotes have become viral. Li referred to a case in which a citizen filling out a form to travel overseas (normal in the PRC) had to write down an emergency contact (the citizen put down their mother as the contact), and the government official overseeing the matter asked the citizen to provide a notarized document to "prove your mom is your mom." Li called this incident "absolutely preposterous". In another case, he referred to a grassroots civil servant who asked for proof that a one-year old does not have a criminal record in order to deliver a government service. In yet another case, Li referred to a senior citizen applying for welfare benefits being forced by government employees to provide proof that "they are still alive." Regarding the latter two incidents, Li said, "this is not a joke, it's all real!"

Manufacturing and technological innovation 
Li Keqiang, a vocal proponent of bolstering technological innovation, lamented how China was producing 800 million tons of steel annually but still importing the specialized type of stainless steel needed to make the better tip cases. The Chinese premier's comments caused consternation in China's pen industry – which was not used to being the topic of mainstream political conversation. These pen companies were once happy to manufacture shoddy pens that were sometimes exported abroad as cheap knockoffs of better brands. Now, they were being told that they were expected to do something more.

He reiterated this point frequently during public appearances, adding that pens using domestically produced parts felt inferior to foreign ones. The ballpoint pen became a potent symbol for perceived flaws in China's economy and technological capabilities. "That's the real situation facing us", Li said at a meeting with economists in December 2015. "We cannot make ballpoint pens with a smooth writing function". In 2016 Li went on national television and bemoaned the failure of his country to produce a good quality version of this seemingly-simple implement. Locally-made versions felt "rough" compared to those from Germany, Switzerland and Japan, Mr Li complained.

On one level, whether China can make a great pen is not hugely important in the scheme of things. High-tech and innovative manufacturing lie at the heart of the central government's Made in China 2025 programme – designed to help domestic growth. Relatively low-value items, like ballpoint pens, have not been a priority. But the pen-conundrum was a symbolic one. About much more than pens, his goal is to encourage independence and innovation. The pen tip issue was first brought into the spotlight by Li Keqiang, offering an insight into a major issue confronting Chinese manufacturers – weak competitiveness in core technology. State-owned Taiyuan Iron and Steel (Group) Co plans to mass-produce ballpoint pen tips and replace imports in two years, company officials said in 2017.

Foreign affairs 
Li Keqiang made his first foreign visit to India on 18 May 2013 in a bid to resolve border disputes and to stimulate economic relations. He said the choice of India as the first international visit highlights Chinese importance in its relations with the country. During prime minister Narendra Modi's visit to China in 2015, Li and Modi took a selfie together at the Temple of Heaven.

During his visit to Pakistan, Li met with the country's top leadership and expressed his views: "As Pakistan's closest friend and brother, we would like to provide as much assistance as we can for the Pakistani side".

Li also visited Switzerland and Germany on his first Europe trip, and met with the two countries' leaders.

United States lieutenant general H. R. McMaster wrote of Li that, "If anyone in the American group had any doubts about China's view of its relationship with the United States, Li's monologue would have removed them. He began with the observation that China, having already developed its industrial and technological base, no longer needed the United States."

Relationship with Xi Jinping 

Many outside observers have remarked that Li has been effectively sidelined by Xi Jinping's consolidation of power, with some calling him the "weakest premier" since the CCP took power in 1949.

At the Third Plenum of the 18th Central Committee held in the fall of 2013, the CCP announced far reaching economic and social reforms. However, the document outlining the reforms was drafted under the leadership of Xi, Liu Yunshan and Zhang Gaoli, and Li was ostensibly not involved in preparing the document. This departure from convention (Wen Jiabao was the principal drafter of documents behind the reforms announced at the Third Plenum of 2003) led to speculation that Li was becoming marginalized in the new administration, and that the widely touted "Xi-Li Administration" in fact did not exist, as power was increasingly being centralized under the hands of Xi as the general secretary of the Chinese Communist Party.

Following the Third Plenum of 2013, Xi amassed a series of leadership roles on four new powerful supra-ministerial bodies overseeing "comprehensively deepening reforms", the internet, military reform, and also the National Security Commission. The "deepening reforms" leading group was said to be encroaching on the affairs in the economic realm normally handled by the premier, and was seen as having the effect of reducing Li's institutional power. However, Li appeared in official press releases as Xi's foremost lieutenant, being named Vice Chairman of the National Security Commission, in addition to becoming the deputy leader of leading groups on "deepening reforms", internet security, and the economy and finance.

Political views 
Li is generally regarded as advocating economic reform and liberalization. He has been described as representing the less ideological and more pragmatic and technocratic side of China's leadership. In August 2022, Li gave a speech in Shenzhen praising Deng Xiaoping his economic reforms, which was later censored by the Chinese government. Wang Juntao, a Chinese dissident and former colleague of Li during his studies at the Peking University, said that Li was "very interested" in political reform.

Personal life 
Li is married to Cheng Hong, a professor in English Language and Literature (especially American Naturalism) at the Capital University of Economics and Business in Beijing. His father-in-law was once the deputy secretary of the Communist Youth League Central Committee. He speaks conversational English.

Awards and honors
 Nishan-e-Pakistan (Pakistan, 2013)

Publication

Notes

References

External links 

 Premier Li Keqiang at the State Council website
 

 
Premiers of the People's Republic of China
1955 births
Living people
 
20th-century Chinese politicians
21st-century Chinese politicians
CCP committee secretaries of Henan
Chinese Communist Party politicians from Anhui
Delegates to the 17th National Congress of the Chinese Communist Party
Delegates to the 18th National Congress of the Chinese Communist Party
Delegates to the 19th National Congress of the Chinese Communist Party
Delegates to the 20th National Congress of the Chinese Communist Party
Delegates to the 8th National People's Congress
Delegates to the 9th National People's Congress
Delegates to the 10th National People's Congress
Delegates to the 11th National People's Congress
Delegates to the 12th National People's Congress
Delegates to the 13th National People's Congress
Economists from Anhui
First Secretaries of the Communist Youth League of China
First vice premiers of the People's Republic of China
Foreign recipients of the Nishan-e-Pakistan
Governors of Henan
Members of the 15th Central Committee of the Chinese Communist Party
Members of the 16th Central Committee of the Chinese Communist Party
Members of the 17th Politburo Standing Committee of the Chinese Communist Party
Members of the 18th Politburo Standing Committee of the Chinese Communist Party
Members of the 19th Politburo Standing Committee of the Chinese Communist Party
People's Republic of China economists
People's Republic of China politicians from Anhui
Peking University alumni
Political office-holders in Liaoning
Politicians from Hefei
Tuanpai